Phat is an English trick-taking partnership card game derived from the 17th century game of All Fours. It is not considered a stand-alone game, but instead a variation of this one. It is quite similar to Don, shortened from Pedro Dom, the name applied to the Five of trumps from the game Pedro, but with the game score resembling the 9-card Don variation, played in England, Ireland, Scotland and Wales.

The object

The aim of the game is to score points by winning tricks containing valuable cards which may give an immediate score to the team that wins the trick to which they have been played. Further points are pegged after the end of the play by the team that has collected more than half of the "muck" in their tricks. There are 88 points in each deal - 80 phat plus 8 for the muck.

Rank of the cards

Phat is played by four players sitting crosswise in two partnerships. The cards rank A K Q J 10 9 8 7 6 5 4 3 2 in every suit.

A standard 52-card pack is used and 13 cards are dealt to each of the player, one at a time. Points are recorded on a yard-long board pretty much resembling a Cribbage board.

The game

Each player cuts a card from the stock and whoever cuts the lowest card will pitch first. The dealer will be the player to the right of the pitcher and the turn to deal and play passes always to the left. The trump is determined by the first card led by the pitcher and subsequently players must follow suit if possible, but otherwise may play any card. The trick is taken by the highest card of the suit led, or by the highest trump if any are played, and the winner of each trick then leads to the next.

Phat score

During the play, the following cards won in tricks entitle the trick-winner to peg his side the corresponding points as follows:

Muck score

Trick-play ended, each side counts the card-point value of all counting-cards it has won in tricks on the following basis:

The side having the greater aggregate value pegs eight holes on the Phat board and the game continues until one side wins by reaching or exceeding a score of 181 points.

Variation

Don
A variant generally called Nine-card Don, also Big Don, Long Don, Welsh Don. Four players sitting crosswise in partnerships receive 9 cards each from a 52-card pack. The aim is to score cards in tricks. The game is 91 or 121 up and the scores are pegged on a Cribbage board. The cards rank are as follows:

One player from each team cuts a card from the pack and whoever cuts the highest card will pitch first. The dealer will be the player to the right of the pitcher and the turn to deal and play passes always to the left. The player to the dealer's left leads first and the suit he plays establishes trumps. Others must follow suit if possible, otherwise may play any card. The trick is taken by the highest card led or by the highest trump if any are played. Each trick-winner leads to the next.

During play, each side pegs immediately the value of any trump counters and Fives taken in tricks. After play, each side counts all counting cards taken in tricks (Aces, Kings, Queens, Jacks, 10s - as shown in the table above) known as the game score. The side with the greater total pegs 8 extra. A slight variation is that a side will claim 6 points for the highest total plus one for the highest trump and another one for the jack of trumps (meaning that sometimes only 7 bonus points are scored). Another variation is to score 5 points for the highest total and one for high trump, one for low trump and one for jack of trumps (again meaning that sometimes only 7 bonus points are scored).

References

External links
 Rules to the game Phat at Pagat.com

All Fours
English card games